Dean Muir (born 6 February 1989) is a South African rugby union player currently playing hooker position for the Houston SaberCats in Major League Rugby (MLR) where he is team captain. He previously played for the San Diego Legion of the MLR.

Career

He returned to the Sharks and was included in their squad for the 2012 Vodacom Cup.

References

1989 births
Living people
Border Bulldogs players
Expatriate rugby union players in the United States
Falcons (rugby union) players
Hanazono Kintetsu Liners players
Rugby union hookers
Rugby union players from Durban
San Diego Legion players
South African expatriate rugby union players
South African expatriate sportspeople in the United States
South African rugby union players
Stormers players
Tshwane University of Technology alumni
Western Province (rugby union) players
Houston SaberCats players